Urmas Kruuse (born 14 July 1965) is an Estonian politician who has been the Minister of Rural Affairs since 2021. From 2014 to 2015, he was the Minister of Health and Labour. He is member of the Estonian Reform Party.

Early life
Ummi graduated from Elva Secondary School and obtained the speciality of business management at International University Audentes. From 1997 to 1999, he worked as sales manager at Siberry Rebase Hulgiladu and from 1999 to 2002, as sales manager of Kesko Food AS. Kruuse has also been active as a freelance musician and has worked as a warehouse operator of Tallinna Tööstuskaubastu.

Political career
From 2002 to 2007, Kruuse was the Mayor of his hometown Elva and from 2007 to 2014, the Mayor of Tartu.

Kruuse became the Minister of Health and Labour in Taavi Rõivas' first cabinet on 26 March 2014 and the Minister of Rural Affairs on 9 April 2015 in Taavi Rõivas' second cabinet.

References

External links
Urmas Kruuse at the Government of Estonia official website

 

1965 births
21st-century Estonian politicians
Agriculture ministers of Estonia
Estonian Reform Party politicians
Health ministers of Estonia
Labour ministers of Estonia
Living people
Mayors of Tartu
Members of the Riigikogu, 2015–2019
Members of the Riigikogu, 2019–2023
Members of the Riigikogu, 2023–2027
People from Elva, Estonia